is a railway station on the Ōito Line in the village of Hakuba, Kitaazumi District, Nagano Prefecture, Japan, operated by East Japan Railway Company (JR East).

Lines
Hakuba Station is served by the Ōito Line and is 59.7 kilometers from the starting point of the line at Matsumoto Station.

Layout
Hakuba Station consists of a one ground-level side platform and one island platform serving three tracks, connected by a footbridge. The station has a Midori no Madoguchi staffed ticket office.

Platforms

Bus Services

Highway buses
 For Narita International Airport
 Chūō Kōsoku Bus; For Shinjuku Station
 For Nagano Station
 For Matsumoto Bus Terminal(Matsumoto Station)

History
It was renamed Hakuba on 1 October 1968. With the privatization of Japanese National Railways (JNR) on 1 April 1987 the station came under the control of JR East.

Passenger statistics
In fiscal 2015, the station was used by an average of 321 passengers daily (boarding passengers only).

Surrounding area

Hakuba village hall
 Hakuba High School

See also
List of railway stations in Japan

References

External links

 JR East station information 

Railway stations in Nagano Prefecture
Ōito Line
Railway stations in Japan opened in 1932
Stations of East Japan Railway Company
Hakuba, Nagano